The 2018 Badminton Asia Junior Championships is the 21st edition of the Asia continental junior championships to crown the best U-19 badminton players across Asia. This tournament was held in Bintaro, Jakarta, Indonesia, between 14 and 22 July 2018.

Tournament
The 2018 Badminton Asia Junior Championships was organized by the Badminton Association of Indonesia, sanctioned by Badminton Asia. This tournament consists of team and individual events. There were 14 teams competing in the mixed team event, which was held from 14–17 July, while the individual events were held from 18–22 July. There were 244 athletes from 18 countries across Asia competing in this tournament.

Venue
This international tournament was held at Jaya Raya Sport Hall Training Center in South Tangerang, Indonesia.

Medalists

Events

Medal table

Team event 
China emerged as the champion after winning three matches against Japan in the final. This was China's eighth title since the junior team championships became a mixed team event in 2006. Indonesia and Malaysia finished as the semifinalists, and took the bronze medals.

References

External links
Team Event at Tournamentsoftware.com
Individual Event at Tournamentsoftware.com

 
Badminton Asia Junior Championships
Badminton Asia Junior Championships
International sports competitions hosted by Indonesia
Asia Junior Championships
Badminton Asia Junior Championships
Badminton Asia Junior Championships
Badminton Asia Junior Championships